DXRR may refer to:
DXRR (Nasipit), an FM station of Manila Broadcasting Company, located in Nasipit, Agusan del Norte
DXRR (Davao City), a defunct FM station of ABS-CBN Corporation, located in Davao City
DXRR-AM, an AM station of Kalayaan Broadcasting System, Inc., located in Davao City